Braceville Township is one of the twenty-four townships of Trumbull County, Ohio, United States.  The 2000 census found 2,887 people in the township.

History
Braceville Township was established in the 1810s, and named after Jonathan Brace, a land agent. It is the only Braceville Township statewide.

Braceville Township was formed from the Connecticut Western Reserve.

Geography
Located in the southwestern part of the county, it borders the following townships and village:
Southington Township - north
Champion Township - northeast corner
Warren Township - east
Lordstown - southeast corner
Newton Township - south
Paris Township, Portage County - southwest corner
Windham Township, Portage County - west
Nelson Township, Portage County - northwest corner

In 1990, the Turnpike Interchange Census-designated place [CDP] was located in Braceville Township; however, this ceased to be a CDP after the 1990 Census.

The Ravenna Training and Logistics Site covers the southwest corner of the township.

Communities
 Braceville
 Center of the World
 Newton Falls
 Phalanx, aka Phalanx Mills

Government
The township is governed by a three-member board of trustees, who are elected in November of odd-numbered years to a four-year term beginning on the following January 1. Two are elected in the year after the presidential election and one is elected in the year before it. There is also an elected township fiscal officer, who serves a four-year term beginning on April 1 of the year after the election, which is held in November of the year before the presidential election. Vacancies in the fiscal officership or on the board of trustees are filled by the remaining trustees.

Notable people
Boxer Earnie Shavers, famous for surviving 15 rounds against Muhammad Ali in 1977, grew up in Braceville.
Ted Toles Jr., pitcher and outfielder who played in Negro league baseball and the Minor Leagues, born and raised in Braceville.
 Emma Rood Tuttle (1839-1916), author

References

External links
County website

Townships in Trumbull County, Ohio
1810s establishments in Ohio
Townships in Ohio